The Denbighshire Militia, later the Royal Denbighshire Rifles was an auxiliary regiment reorganised in the Welsh county of Denbighshire during the 18th Century from earlier precursor units. Primarily intended for home defence, it provided a contingent for service in France in the closing stages of the Napoleonic War. After a series of short-lived mergers with other Welsh militia regiments it became part of the Royal Welsh Fusiliers, It served as a Special Reserve training unit in World War I. After 1921 the militia had only a shadowy existence until its final abolition in 1953.

Denbigh Trained Bands

King Henry VIII called a 'Great Muster' in 1539, and the muster book compiled by John Salesbury, Steward of 'Denbighland', showed 2022 men available for service, of whom 901 were unarmoured foot soldiers, 241 were bowmen and 880 were billmen. Of these, 511 had 'thick coats' and 97 had Sallet helmets or 'skoles' (iron skullcaps), but the only men with 'harness' or armour were the 24 billmen of the steward's own household.

The legal basis of the militia was updated by two Acts of 1557 covering musters and the maintenance of horses and armour. The county militia was now under the Lord Lieutenant, assisted by the Deputy Lieutenants and Justices of the Peace (JPs). The entry into force of these Acts in 1558 is seen as the starting date for the organised Militia of England and Wales. Although the militia obligation was universal, it was clearly impractical to train and equip every able-bodied man, so after 1572 the practice was to select a proportion of men for the Trained Bands, who were mustered for regular training. During the Armada crisis of 1588, from its 1200 able-bodied men Denbighshire furnished 400 trained foot and 200 untrained 'pioneers', together with 30 light horse and 30 'petronel's (the petronel was an early cavalry firearm).

In the 16th Century little distinction was made between the militia and the troops levied by the counties for overseas expeditions. However, the counties usually conscripted the unemployed and criminals rather than the Trained Bandsmen. Between 1585 and 1602 Montgomeryshire supplied 980 men for service in Ireland, and a further 75 for France. The men were given three days' 'conduct money' to get to Chester, the main port of embarkation for Ireland. Conduct money was recovered from the government, but replacing the weapons issued to the levies from the militia armouries was a heavy cost on the counties.

With the passing of the threat of invasion, the trained bands declined in the early 17th Century. Later, King Charles I attempted to reform them into a national force or 'Perfect Militia' answering to the king rather than local control. In 1638 the Denbigh Trained Band under Colonel William Wynne consisted of 239 musketeers and 161 pikemen, with 50 men in the Denbigh Trained Band Horse. In 1640 the county was ordered to send a detachment of 200 men to Newcastle upon Tyne to take part in the Second Bishops' War.

Civil War
Control of the militia was one of the areas of dispute between Charles I and Parliament that led to the English Civil War. When open war broke out between the King and Parliament, neither side made much use of the trained bands beyond securing the county armouries for their own full-time troops. Most of Wales was under Royalist control for much of the war, and was a recruiting ground for the King's armies. In August 1642 Colonel Sir Thomas Salusbury, 2nd Baronet of Lleweni, raised a Royalist foot regiment mainly from Denbighshire and Flintshire, which served throughout the war from the Battle of Edgehill until the final surrender in 1646. In January 1643 Col William Wynne raised a Royalist foot regiment of four (later five) companies and a troop of horse, from Denbigh, Langernew, Ruthin and Llangollen (largely from his own Denbigh Trained Band, it appears) that served in Lord Capel's force and in the Chester garrison. It saw action at a number of skirmishes, including one at Wem in October 1643 where Col Wynne was killed and was succeeded in command by his lieutenant-colonel Hugh Wynne. The regiment was besieged at Oswestry in June 1644, was at the Battle of Rowton Heath in September 1645 and the Siege of Chester that ended in February 1646. The regiment was besieged in Denbigh Castle from April 1646 and finally surrendered on 14 October.

Denbighshire Militia
After the Restoration of the Monarchy, the Militia was re-established by the Militia Act of 1661 under the control of the king's lords lieutenant, the men to be selected by ballot. This was popularly seen as the 'Constitutional Force' to counterbalance a 'Standing Army' tainted by association with the New Model Army that had supported Cromwell's military dictatorship.

The militia forces in the Welsh counties were small, and were grouped together under the command of the Lord President of the Council of Wales. In 1665 the Denbighshire Militia was commanded by Col John Robinson, with Captain John Salusbury commanding a Troop of Denbighshire Horse Militia. As Lord President, the Duke of Beaufort carried out a tour of inspection of the Welsh militia in 1684, when the Denbighshire contingent consisted of one troop of horse and five foot companies commanded by Sir Richard Myddelton, 3rd Baronet of Chirk Castle. In 1697 it consisted of 500 foot under Major-General the Earl of Macclesfield (Lord Lieutenant of Denbighshire) and 62 horse under Capt John Doulton.

Generally the militia declined in the long peace after the Treaty of Utrecht in 1713. Jacobites were numerous amongst the Welsh Militia, but they did not show their hands during the Risings of 1715 and 1745, and bloodshed was avoided.

1757 reforms

Under threat of French invasion during the Seven Years' War a series of Militia Acts from 1757 re-established county militia regiments, the men being conscripted by means of parish ballots (paid substitutes were permitted) to serve for three years. There was a property qualification for officers, who were commissioned by the lord lieutenant. An adjutant and drill sergeants were to be provided to each regiment from the Regular Army, and arms and accoutrements would be supplied when the county had secured 60 per cent of its quota of recruits.

Denbighshire was given a quota of 280 men to raise, but recruitment throughout Wales was slow. The problem was less with the other ranks raised by ballot than the shortage of men qualified to be officers, even after the requirements were lowered for Welsh counties. Richard Myddleton of Chirk Castle, Lord Lieutenant of Denbighshire, took command of the regiment himself and its arms and Regimental Colours were finally issued to it at Wrexham on 8 May 1760. It was organised into five companies and was embodied for fulltime service on 17 July 1760.

Shortly after embodiment the regiment was sent to North Devon where it established regimental headquarters (HQ) at Barnstaple. The main duty was to guard prisoners of war and to escort parties of them from Barnstaple to Plymouth. In October 1761 the regiment moved the short distance to relieve the East Devon Militia at Bideford where the duties were similar. Early the following month the regiment marched to Shrewsbury in Shropshire where it probably stayed for the remainder of its embodied service. In January 1763 it marched back to Wrexham to be disembodied.

In peacetime the adjutant, sergeants and drummers of the disembodied regiment maintained the militia store and armoury in Wrexham Town Hall at the top of the High Street. Training was sporadic and usually by isolated companies rather than the whole regiment, but the numbers were maintained by periodic enforcement of the ballot. Conscription by means of the ballot was unpopular even in peacetime, and Denbighshire suffered anti-militia riots in 1769.

War of American Independence
The militia were called out on 26 March 1778 during the War of American Independence, when the country was  threatened with invasion by the Americans' allies, France and Spain. Having assembled at Wrexham under the command of John Myddleton of Gwaenynog, the Denbighshires marched off to garrison Cockermouth in Cumberland. An anonymous letter of December 1778 reported that in the Denbighshires the major had been absent from June, the colonel since September, one captain had never joined while the other, who had never been away more than two weeks, was a Member of Parliament and now had to attend its sitting.  Nevertheless, the other officers and the drill sergeants must have made progress: next year an inspecting officer commented that the Denbighshires were fine men and quite proficient, although they had had little chance to train together. The pauses between the movements in the manual exercise were too long, a fault that the commanding officer promised to correct.

During the American war a number of counties raised additional volunteer companies for their militia regiments, manned by men enlisted for a cash bounty. There is evidence that Denbighshire formed one such company, paid for by patriotic subscription.

In January 1779 the regiment had two companies detached to Workington and in May two were detached to Whitehaven (which had been raided by John Paul Jones the previous year) and one to Maryport. By July the regiment had marched to Chester where it stayed until mid-August. In September the regiment visited its home county, with companies stationed in Wrexham, Denbigh and Ruthin (perhaps in connection with recruitment) and then returned to the Chester garrison by the beginning of October. In late 1779 there were machine-breaking riots in Lancashire and the Denbighshire Militia sent three companies from Chester to Liverpool to assist Sir George Savile's West Riding Regiment that was hard-pressed to send detachments to deal with riots at Wigan, Chorley and other towns as well as to carry out its primary duty of guarding large numbers of prisoners of war.

Nine officers and 43 other ranks claimed leave to go home to vote in the 1780 general election. By March 1781 the whole regiment was back in Denbighshire, with companies stationed in Denbigh, Ruthin and Llanrwst. Shortly afterwards it was sent to Sussex, and spent some time at Warley Camp in Essex. It continued serving in South East England until the Treaty of Paris was signed in 1783 and orders were issued on 28 February to disembody the militia. The regiment was already marching back to North Wales, and on arrival at Wrexham it was promptly paid off.

From 1784 to 1792 the militia were assembled for their 28 days' annual peacetime training, but to save money only two-thirds of the men were actually mustered each year.

French Revolutionary and Napoleonic Wars
Revolutionary France declared war on Britain on 1 February 1793. The Denbighshire Militia were embodied shortly afterwards, still under the command of John Myddleton, and once again were sent to Cumberland, to garrison Whitehaven until November.

The French Revolutionary War and Napoleonic Wars saw a new phase for the English militia: they were embodied for a whole generation, and became regiments of full-time professional soldiers (though restricted to service in the British Isles), which the regular army increasingly saw as a prime source of recruits. They served in coast defences, manning garrisons, guarding prisoners of war, and for internal security, while their traditional local defence duties were taken over by the Volunteers and mounted Yeomanry.

The Denbighshire marched south in November 1793, being stationed in Oxfordshire and Berkshire over the winter, moving to Hampshire in the spring. From 1 April it was at Andover with detachments at Salisbury and Winchester, and was joined on 24 June by two newly raised volunteer companies (147 men) whose clothing, equipment and bounties had been paid for by patriotic subscription.

By 14 July 1794 the regiment was at Porchester with the Dorset Militia where the two regiments guarded French prisoners of war. One dark night a sentry of the Dorsets saw what he thought was an apparition of a white devil's face with horns and a beard. He challenged the apparition and when it did not reply he fired his musket at it, to find himself being charged by the Denbighshire's white goat mascot. Hearing the shot, the guard turned out and the goat put them to flight as well before returning to the Denbighshire drum major's quarters.

From Porchester the Denbighshires were moved to nearby Fareham by November 1794, then  to Greenwich by mid-December. Early in 1795 the regiment was at Tunbridge Wells in Kent, then spent the summer months moving around the south-eastern counties of England before going into winter quarters back in Hampshire at Gosport. 

In 1796, in a fresh attempt to have as many men as possible under arms for home defence in order to release regulars, the Government created the Supplementary Militia, a compulsory levy of men to be trained in their spare time, and to be incorporated into the Regular Militia as required. Denbighshire's additional quota was fixed at 420 men, and a team from the embodied regiment went to Wrexham to train the supplementaries before they marched to join the regiment.

In March 1796 the regiment marched back to Kent and was stationed at various towns before moving into the Dover garrison in May, where the first batch of 70 supplementary militiamen joined the regiment. Been June 1796 and July 1799 the regiment was moved around Kent and Sussex, very often with the Grenadier and Light companies detached to other stations. An Act authorising the deployment of British militia units in Ireland was passed in 1798 and the Denbighshires were among six Welsh regiments that volunteered for this service, though their offer was not taken up. In December 1799 the regiment returned to the Portsmouth defences. A year later it moved on to Devon, first to Honiton in November and then to Ottery St Mary for winter quarters, with detachments in the surrounding villages.

The Treaty of Amiens brought an end to hostilities and the Denbighshire Militia were marched back to Wrexham in December 1801 for disembodiment. However, the peace proved short-lived, and the militia had already been called out again when Britain declared war in May 1803. There had been some consolidation of Militia legislation, and the Lord Lieutenant of Denbighshire (and Colonel of the Denbighshire Militia) Sir Watkin Williams-Wynn, 5th Baronet, proposed that the small Denbighshire and Merionethshire contingents should be combined to support a full-size regiment: the proposal was rejected at this time. Under the command of Lt-Col R. Williams-Wynn the Denbighshires marched to its war station at Woolwich, where it remained until June 1805, training on Plumstead Common. The Supplementary Militia ballot was again enforced in Denbighshire and the reinforcements sent to join the regiment. Militiamen who volunteered for the regulars also had to be replaced by means of the ballot. In April 1804 the regiment was one of 12 Welsh militia regiments awarded the prefix 'Royal'.

In the summer of 1805 the regiment was again in garrison at Dover, this time stationed in the Castle with the Hertfordshire Militia. The following summer it was at the newly built Fort Pitt at Chatham, Kent, then between August 1806 and July 1808 it moved around Kent, with a spell back at Fort Pitt between March and May 1807. It returned to Fort Pitt again in July 1808 and remained there until 1811. In 1809 the regiment was converted to Light Infantry: apart from the title, the changes to dress and weaponry were minor, the drums being replaced by bugles and the sergeants' halberds by fusils (light muskets).

In May 1811 the regiment marched out of Fort Pitt on its way to Bristol, where the duties included guarding prisoners of war at Stapleton Prison and manning the Avon forts. It was ordered to Portsmouth in April 1812 but on the way it was diverted to the industrial north of England where there had been an outbreak of Luddite machine-breaking. The regiment went to Yorkshire, first to Sheffield and then Hull, where it arrived in June. Between January and June 1813 it was at Mansfield in Nottinghamshire, then moved to Nantwich in Cheshire. The regiment then moved into the Chester Garrison, where it  stayed for the remainder of its embodiment.

Late in 1813 the regiment was redesignated the Royal Denbighshire Rifle Corps of Militia. As such it adopted rifles in place of muskets, and gave up its regimental colours. In January the following year Rifle green uniforms were issued.

3rd Provisional Battalion
In November 1813 the militia were invited to volunteer for limited overseas service, primarily for garrison duties in Europe. Some 242 out of 300 men of the Royal Denbighshire Rifles volunteered, but many withdrew and joined the regular army when it became clear that Col Sir Watkin Williams-Wynn was not to lead them. Rather than lose the whole Denbighshire contingent, the War Office appointed Sir Watkin as commanding officer of the 3rd Provisional Battalion and he had no difficulty in persuading many of his officers and men to accompany him. The battalion was formed as follows:

3rd Provisional Battalion
 Royal Denbighshire Rifles – 135 all ranks
 Derbyshire Militia – 125 all ranks
 Herefordshire Militia – 110 all ranks
 Westmorland Militia – 162 all ranks
 2nd West Yorkshire Militia – 349 all ranks

The battalion assembled at Chester and marched to Portsmouth where the Militia Brigade under the Marquess of Buckingham was assembling. The brigade embarked on 10–11 March 1814 and three days later arrived at Bordeaux, which had just been occupied by the Earl of Dalhousie's 7th Division. It did not take part in the Battle of Toulouse on 10 April, but carried out garrison and occupation duties as the war was ending. The 3rd Provisional Battalion was quartered in a villages along the River Gironde. The brigade did not form part of the Army of Occupation after the abdication of Napoleon and returned to Plymouth in June. The Denbigh detachment marched back to Wrexham for disbandment.<ref name

Waterloo and the long peace
The rest of the Royal Denbighshire Rifles at Chester had been brought up to strength by means of the ballot. It too marched back to Wrexham in June 1814 to be disembodied. However, Napoleon's return to France in 1815 led to another war and the Royal Denbighshire Rifles were embodied once more in May. The regiment was recruited up to strength by 'beat of drum' and by the ballot and returned to the Chester garrison. The short war was ended by the Battle of Waterloo in June, and the regiment was disembodied again in September.

After Waterloo there was another long peace. Although officers continued to be commissioned into the militia and ballots were still held, the regiments were rarely assembled for training (the Denbighs only trained in 1821, 1825 and 1831, and then not again for 21 years) and the permanent staffs of sergeants and drummers were progressively reduced. Other than those of the permanent staff, who supported the parish constables, all weapons were returned to store at Chester Castle.

Robert Myddelton-Biddulph of Chirk Castle became colonel of the Royal Denbighshire Rifles after the death of Sir Watkin Williams-Wynn in 1840.

1852 reforms
The Militia of the United Kingdom was revived by the Militia Act of 1852, enacted during a period of international tension. As before, units were raised and administered on a county basis, and filled by voluntary enlistment (although conscription by means of the militia ballot might be used if the counties failed to meet their quotas). Training was for 56 days on enlistment, then for 21–28 days per year, during which the men received full army pay. Under the Act, militia units could be embodied by Royal Proclamation for full-time service in three circumstances:
 1. 'Whenever a state of war exists between Her Majesty and any foreign power'.
 2. 'In all cases of invasion or upon imminent danger thereof'.
 3. 'In all cases of rebellion or insurrection'.

The rank of colonel was abolished in the militia, but Col Myddelton-Biddulph retained his rank until his death in 1872. The county lieutenancy and permanent staff recruited the Royal Denbighshire Rifles up to its established strength of 400 men, though some recruits had to be sought from outside the county because of the opposition of the Non-conformist churches in Denbighshire. The regiment was drawn out for training at Wrexham in 1853.

Crimean War and after
War having broken out with Russia in 1854 and an expeditionary force sent to the Crimea, the militia began to be called out for home defence. However, it appears that the Royal Denbighshire Rifles was only embodied for an extended training period at Wrexham until June 1856, and did not carry out any garrison duties. Over 40 of the men volunteered for the regulars, mainly for the Brigade of Guards or the 23rd Foot (Royal Welch Fusiliers) who had distinguished themselves at the Battle of the Alma. Similarly, it appears that the regiment was not embodied to relieve regulars during the Indian Mutiny.

In 1857 the regiment moved its HQ and armoury out of Wrexham Town Hall into a purpose-built Militia Barracks on Regent Street in the town. In 1860 the Brunswick rifle with which it had been equipped was replaced by the Short Enfield rifle.

In 1861 the War Office ordered the amalgamation of the Denbighshire and Flintshire militia quotas to form a larger regiment. The Royal Denbighshire Rifles were officially merged with the Royal Flint Rifles at Mold to form the Royal Denbigh & Flint Rifles. However, the two contingents continued to operate separately and the merger was rescinded in 1867 when the regiments reverted to their previous titles.

The Militia Reserve introduced in 1867 consisted of present and former militiamen who undertook to serve overseas in case of war. From 1871 The militia came under the War Office rather than their county lords lieutenant and by now the battalions had a large cadre of permanent staff (about 30). Around a third of the recruits and many young officers went on to join the regular army. About this time the Royal Denbigh Rifles were re-equipped with the new Snider–Enfield breechloader.

Cardwell Reforms
Under the 'Localisation of the Forces' scheme introduced by the Cardwell Reforms of 1872, the militia were brigaded with their local regular and volunteer battalions on 1 April 1873. For the Royal Denbigh Rifles this was in No 23 Brigade Sub-District covering the militia of the five northern counties of Wales (Anglesey, Carnarvon, Denbigh, Flint and Merioneth), grouped with the 23rd (Royal Welch Fusiliers) and the Denbigh and Flint rifle volunteers.

Following the Cardwell Reforms a mobilisation scheme began to appear in the Army List from December 1875. This assigned regular and militia units to places in an order of battle of corps, divisions and brigades for the 'Active Army', even though these formations were entirely theoretical, with no staff or services assigned. The Royal Denbigh Rifles were assigned as 'Divisional Troops' to 1st Division, VI Corps. The division would have mustered at Chester in time of war.

Once again the small size of the Welsh regiments led to mergers. In 1876 the Royal Denbigh Rifles were amalgamated with the Royal Merioneth Rifles to form the Royal Denbigh & Merioneth Rifles, 800 strong.

In 1877 the Royal Denbighshire & Merioneth Rifles moved out of their barracks on Regent Street, Wrexham, and moved into the Royal Welch Fusiliers' new depot at Hightown Barracks outside the town.

On 19 April 1878 the militia reserve was called out during the period of international tension over the Russo-Turkish War. The contingent from the Royal Denbigh & Merioneth Rifles was sent to Enniskillen in Ireland to train with 1st Battalion, Royal Welch Fusiliers.

3rd Battalion, Royal Welch Fusiliers

The Childers Reforms of 1881 took Cardwell's reforms further, with the militia formally joining their linked regiments. Of the four regiments in No 23 Sub-District, the Royal Anglesey Militia had been converted to Royal Engineers and the Royal Flint Militia became 6th Battalion King's Royal Rifle Corps (KRRC). The others formed two battalions of the Royal Welch Fusiliers (RWF):
 3rd (Royal Denbigh & Merioneth Militia) Battalion
 4th (Royal Carnarvon Militia) Battalion

The rifle regiments gave up their green uniforms and adopted the red of the RWF, and by 1886 the Royal Denbigh & Merioneth had been presented with new Colours.

The 6th (Royal Flint Militia) Bn, KRRC, was disbanded in 1889, after which the Army List shows that the titles of the RWF militia battalions were altered: 
 3rd (Royal Denbigh & Flint Militia) Battalion
 4th (Royal Carnarvon & Merioneth Militia) Battalion

Second Boer War
After the disasters of Black Week at the start of the Second Boer War in December 1899, most of the regular army was sent to South Africa, and many militia units were called out to replace them. The 3rd Bn RWF was accordingly embodied on 8 December 1899. Although it only served at home, its militia reservists were sent as reinforcements to the 1st Battalion RWF serving in South Africa. They participated in an action at Rooidam and the march to relieve Mafeking.

Shortly after the battalion was embodied it moved to Plymouth, where it was quartered in Crownhill Barracks. On 9 May it moved to Salisbury Plain for training. It returned to Crownhill in October where it remained until the end of June 1901. The regiment was then disembodied at Wrexham on 5 July 1901.

Special Reserve

After the Boer War, there were moves to reform the Auxiliary Forces (militia, yeomanry and volunteers) to take their place in the six army corps proposed by St John Brodrick as Secretary of State for War. However, little of Brodrick's scheme was carried out. Under the sweeping Haldane Reforms of 1908, the militia was replaced by the Special Reserve, a semi-professional force similar to the previous militia reserve, whose role was to provide reinforcement drafts for regular units serving overseas in wartime.

The 3rd Militia Battalion accordingly transferred to the SR as the 3rd (Reserve) Battalion, Royal Welch Fusiliers on 28 June 1908.

World War I
When war broke out on 4 August 1914 the battalion was embodied at Pembroke Dock (probably where it was on annual training); it returned to Wrexham to mobilise on 9 August under the command of Lt-Col H.R. Jones-Williams, CO since 15 July 1912. The 3rd Battalion's role was to equip the Reservists and Special Reservists of the Royal Welch Fusiliers and send them as reinforcement drafts to the regular battalions serving on the Western Front. Once the pool of reservists had dried up, the 3rd Bn trained thousands of raw recruits for the active service battalions. The 12th (Reserve) Battalion was formed alongside the 3rd Bn at Wrexham in October 1914 to provide reinforcements for the 'Kitchener's Army' battalions of the RWF.

Among the young officers who entered the regiment through the Special Reserve at this time was Robert Graves, the future war poet, who described his experience at Wrexham in his memoir Good-Bye to All That. Because of the shortage of khaki service uniforms, the SR men were initially clothed in temporary blue uniforms, or even old scarlet tunics. Among the duties for the RWF special reservists was to guard an internment camp for German civilians set up in a disused waggon works at Lancaster. One of the first new SR officers of the regiment to be killed was Will Gladstone, MP, son of the former prime minister W.E. Gladstone.

In May 1915 the 3rd Bn went to Litherland, Liverpool, and then in November 1917 it moved to Ireland and was stationed at Limerick until the end of the war After the Armistice with Germany the 3rd Bn continued in service until the remaining personnel were drafted to the 2nd Bn on 9 August 1919 and the battalion was disembodied on 23 August.

Postwar
The SR resumed its old title of Militia in 1921 but like most militia units the 3rd RWF remained in abeyance after World War I. By the outbreak of World War II in 1939, no officers remained listed for the 3rd Bn. The Militia was formally disbanded in April 1953.

Commanders
The following commanded the regiment:

Colonel
 John Robinson, 1665
 Sir Richard Myddelton, 3rd Baronet of Chirk Castle, 1684
 Earl of Macclesfield, 1697
 Richard Myddleton of Chirk Castle, 1760
 Watkyn Wynn of Wynnstay, 1762
 John Myddleton of Gwaenynog, 1778
 Richard John Kenrick of Nantclywd, 1794
 Sir Watkin Williams-Wynn, 5th Baronet, 15 January 1797, died 1840
 Robert Myddelton-Biddulph of Chirk Castle, 1840

Lieutenant-Colonel Commandant'''
 Sir Robert Cunliffe, 5th Baronet, of Acton Hall, formerly of the Scots Fusilier Guards, 22 May 1872
 Samuel Sandbach, 21 November 1894
 Rumley F. Godfrey, 15 July 1905
 H.R. Jones-Williams, 15 July 1912Honorary Colonel Sir Robert Cunliffe, 5th Baronet, former CO appointed 12 May 1886
 Nevill Vaughan Lloyd-Mostyn, 3rd Lord Mostyn, appointed 4 October 1905

Heritage & ceremonial
Uniforms & insignia
From 1760 to 1813 the uniform was similar to that of the regular infantry of the line, with blue facings on the red coat. On conversion to rifles in 1813 he uniform changed to Rifle green with blue facings. As a battalion of the Royal Welch Fusiliers it adopted that regiment's red uniform with blue facings.Parkyn.

After the regular Rifle regiments adopted a busby as their head-dress in 1873, the officers of the Royal Denbigh & Merioneth Rifles also adopted it by 1877. The permanent staff continued to wear the older  Shako, while the other ranks wore the Glengarry cap. The officers later adopted the bearskin fusilier cap of the RWF.

The other ranks' buttons of the Denbighshire Militia  ca 1797 showed the Prince of Wales's feathers, coronet and motto 'ICH DIEN' above the letters 'DM', later replaced by 'ROYAL DENBIGH'. The officers' shoulder belt plate bore a similar design in silver, with the coronet gilded, either above or between the letters 'RD'. The bronze shako plate ca 1830 consisted of the feathers, coronet and motto superimposed on a rayed star surmounted by a crown, a scroll beneath inscribed 'ROYAL DENBIGH'. About 1857 the badge on the other ranks' undress cap was a stringed bugle-horn above the 'ROYAL DENBIGH' scroll (changed to 'DENBIGH AND FLINT' 1861–7). By about 1877 until 1881 the other ranks' Glengarry cap badge consisted of the Welsh dragon encircled by a garter inscribed 'Y DDRAIG GOCH A DDYRY GYCHWYN' ('The Red Dragon creates an impetus'). The officers' busby badge at this time was a simple crown over a bugle-horn. After 1881 the regiment adopted the RWF insignia.

The Regimental colour issued in 1760 carried the Coat of arms of the Lord Lieutenant of Denbighshire (at that time Richard Myddleton of Chirk Castle, who was also the regiment's colonel) on a red field, presumably on a blue backing to match the regiment's facings. The regiment carried no colours when it was designated as rifles.

Precedence
In 1760 a system of drawing lots was introduced to determine the relative precedence of militia regiments serving together. During the War of American Independence the counties were given an order of precedence determined by ballot each year. For the Denbighshire Militia the positions were:
 1778 – 22nd
 1779 – 4th
 1780 – 40th
 1781 – 24th
 1783 – 34th

The militia order of precedence balloted for in 1793 (Denbighshire was 7th) remained in force throughout the French Revolutionary War. Another ballot for precedence took place at the start of the Napoleonic War, when Denbighshire was 4th. This order continued until 1833. In that year the King drew the lots and the resulting list remained in force with minor amendments until the end of the militia. The regiments raised before the peace of 1763 took the first places and the Denbighshire was awarded 46th place. The regimental number was only a subsidiary title and most regiments paid little attention to it.

See also
 Trained Bands
 Militia (English)
 Militia (Great Britain)
 Militia (United Kingdom)
 Royal Welch Fusiliers

Footnotes

Notes

References

 W.Y. Baldry, 'Order of Precedence of Militia Regiments', Journal of the Society for Army Historical Research, Vol 15, No 57 (Spring 1936), pp. 5–16.
 C.G. Cruickshank, Elizabeth's Army, 2nd Edn, Oxford: Oxford University Press, 1966.
 Capt John Davis, Historical Records of the Second Royal Surrey or Eleventh Regiment of Militia, London: Marcus Ward, 1877.
 Col John K. Dunlop, The Development of the British Army 1899–1914, London: Methuen, 1938.
 Mark Charles Fissel, The Bishops' Wars: Charles I's campaigns against Scotland 1638–1640, Cambridge: Cambridge University Press, 1994, ISBN 0-521-34520-0.
 Sir John Fortescue, A History of the British Army, Vol I, 2nd Edn, London: Macmillan, 1910.
 Sir John Fortescue, A History of the British Army, Vol II, London: Macmillan, 1899.
 Sir John Fortescue, A History of the British Army, Vol III, 2nd Edn, London: Macmillan, 1911.
 J.B.M. Frederick, Lineage Book of British Land Forces 1660–1978, Vol I, Wakefield: Microform Academic, 1984, ISBN 1-85117-007-3.
 Robert Graves, Goodbye to All That, London: Cassell, 1929 & 1957/ Penguin, 1960.
 Lt-Col James Moncrieff Grierson (Col Peter S. Walton, ed.), Scarlet into Khaki: The British Army on the Eve of the Boer War, London: Sampson Low,
 Lt-Col H.G. Hart, The New Annual Army List, and Militia List (various dates from 1840).
 Col George Jackson Hay, An Epitomized History of the Militia (The Constitutional Force), London:United Service Gazette, 1905/Ray Westlake Military Books, 1987 ISBN 0-9508530-7-0.
 Richard Holmes, Soldiers: Army Lives and Loyalties from Redcoats to Dusty Warriors, London: HarperPress, 2011, ISBN 978-0-00-722570-5.
 Brig E.A. James, British Regiments 1914–18, London: Samson Books, 1978, ISBN 0-906304-03-2/Uckfield: Naval & Military Press, 2001, ISBN 978-1-84342-197-9.
 H. Moyse-Bartlett, 'Dover at War', Journal of the Society for Army Historical Research, 1972, Vol 50, No 203 (Autumn 1972), pp. 131–54.
 Sir Charles Oman,A History of the Peninsular War, Vol VII, August 1813 to April 14, 1814, Oxford: Clarendon Press, 1930/London: Greenhill Books, 1997, ISBN 1-85367-227-0.
 Bryn Owen, History of the Welsh Militia and Volunteer Corps 1757–1908: Denbighshire and Flintshire (Part 1): Regiments of Militia, Wrexham: Bridge Books, 1997, ISBN 1-872424-57-0.
 Bryn Owen, History of the Welsh Militia and Volunteer Corps 1757–1908: 1: Anglesey and Caernarfonshire, Caernarfon: Palace Books, 1989, ISBN 1-871904-00-5.
  Maj H.G. Parkyn, 'Welsh Militia Regiments 1757–1881: Their Badges and Buttons', Journal of the Society for Army Historical Research, Vol 32, No 130 (Summer 1954), pp. 57–63.
 Col H.C.B. Rogers, Battles and Generals of the Civil Wars 1642–1651, London: Seeley Service 1968.
 Arthur Sleigh, The Royal Militia and Yeomanry Cavalry Army List, April 1850, London: British Army Despatch Press, 1850/Uckfield: Naval and Military Press, 1991, ISBN 978-1-84342-410-9.
 Edward M. Spiers, The Army and Society 1815–1914, London: Longmans, 1980, ISBN 0-582-48565-7.
 Edward M. Spiers, The Late Victorian Army 1868–1902, Manchester: Manchester University Press, 1992/Sandpiper Books, 1999, ISBN 0-7190-2659-8.
 Dame Veronica Wedgwood, The King's War 1641–1647: The Great Rebellion, London: Collins, 1958/Fontana, 1966.
 J.R. Western, The English Militia in the Eighteenth Century: The Story of a Political Issue 1660–1802, London: Routledge & Kegan Paul, 1965.
 Brig Peter Young, Edgehill 1642: The Campaign and the Battle'', Kineton: Roundwood, 1967.

External sources
 British Civil Wars, Commonwealth & Protectorate, 1638–1660 (the BCW Project)

Denbighshire
Military units and formations in Denbighshire
Military units and formations in Wrexham
Denbighshire
Military units and formations established in 1662
Military units and formations disestablished in 1881